The  (AMRC) is an ancillary establishment of Yokohama City University (YCU) in Kanazawa-ku, Yokohama, Japan. It was established in October 2006, and a new research building at the AMRC was opened on the YCU Fukuura campus in March 2013. The AMRC research building was further enlarged in 2015.

Research 
Research at the AMRC covers a wide variety of medical fields, including oncology, immunology, genetics, regenerative medicine, translational research and bioinformatics.

Organization  
Department of Research and Development (Hideki TANIGUCHI)
Department of Clinical Research Promotion (Yasuo TERAUCHI)
Department of Research Support and coordination (Takuya TAKAHASHI)
Biobank Division
Bioinformatics Laboratory

Directors
Atsushi NAKAJIMA (current)
Nobuhiko ORIDATE
Tomio INOUE
Hisashi HIRANO
Shigeo OHNO (2006 to 2008)

References

External links 
 

Yokohama City University
Medical research institutes in Japan
2006 establishments in Japan